Arno Bertogna (born 9 April 1959 in Perth, Western Australia) is an Australian former association football player.

Playing career

Club career
Bertogna began his senior career with Azzurri in the WA State League, winning the league and cup in his first year.

After two seasons with Azzurri he was given the opportunity of a trial at German first division side Eintracht Frankfurt, but found no further consideration there. After a stint back at Azzurri he left again for a trial with Sheffield United.

On his return to Australia he was signed to Newcastle KB United. He later joined Wollongong City before finally settling at APIA. Playing with APIA he made 132 appearances in the National Soccer League over six seasons. In 1988 at the age of 29 he stepped away from the professional game.

International career
Bertogna made his full international debut for Australia against Chinese Taipei in Taipei in November 1979. Playing three further matches for the Socceroos, he played his last game against Greece in Athens in November 1980.

He also played nine times in Socceroos B internationals.

Honours

Club 

 Azzurri
 WA State League First Division Championship: 1976
 WA State League Top Four Cup: 1976

Country 

 Australia national association football team
 OFC Nations Cup: 1980

References

1959 births
Australian soccer players
Australia international soccer players
Living people
Australian people of Italian descent
Association football midfielders
Soccer players from Perth, Western Australia
Perth SC players
Newcastle KB United players
Wollongong Wolves FC players
APIA Leichhardt FC players
1980 Oceania Cup players